The term active center may refer to:
Active center (polymer science), the site on a chain carrier at which reaction occurs
The active site of an enzyme